The 2011 Chicago Fire season was the club's 16th year of existence, as well as their 14th season in Major League Soccer and their 14th consecutive year in the top-flight of American soccer.

Overview

February

Squad 
As of September 14, 2011.

Player movement

Transfers

In

Out

Loans

In

Out

League table

Results summary

Results by round

Match results

Pre-season 
Kickoff times are in CST.

Carolina Challenge Cup 

Kickoff times are in CST.

Major League Soccer 
Kickoff times are in CST.

U.S. Open Cup

Kickoff times are in CST.

International friendlies 
Kickoff times are in CST.

Recognition

Kits

Leading scorers

Last updated on October 23, 2011. Source: MLSsoccer.com Statistics - 2011 Chicago Fire

MLS Team of the Week

MLS Player of the Week

MLS All-Stars 2011

Miscellany

Allocation ranking 
Chicago is in the #5 position in the MLS Allocation Ranking. The allocation ranking is the mechanism used to determine which MLS club has first priority to acquire a U.S. National Team player who signs with MLS after playing abroad, or a former MLS player who returns to the league after having gone to a club abroad for a transfer fee. Chicago traded allocation ranking positions with Seattle Sounders FC on August 26, 2011, with Seattle gaining the #4 position and Chicago receiving the #6 position.

International roster spots 
Chicago has 8 international roster spots. Each club in Major League Soccer is allocated 8 international roster spots, which can be traded. There have been no reported trades involving Chicago international roster spots for the 2011 season. There is no limit on the number of international slots on each club's roster. The remaining roster slots must belong to domestic players. For clubs based in the United States, a domestic player is either a U.S. citizen, a permanent resident (green card holder) or the holder of other special status (e.g., refugee or asylum status).

Future draft pick trades

MLS rights to other players 
It is believed Chicago maintains the MLS rights to Carlos Bocanegra, Wilman Conde, Freddie Ljungberg, and Chris Rolfe as each of these players declined contract offers by the club and signed overseas on free transfers.

References 

Chicago Fire FC seasons
Chicago Fire
Chicago Fire
Chicago Fire